Andrey Klimov (born 26 July 1982) is a Russian professional boxer who challenged for the IBF super-featherweight title in 2015.

Professional career

Klimov vs. Crawford 
Klimov won the first 16 fights of his career, before losing a unanimous decision to Terence Crawford on 5 October 2013.

Klimov vs. Pedraza 
On 13 June 2015, he fought José Pedraza and lost by unanimous decision, 120-108, 120-108 and 119-109 in favor of Pedraza.

Klimov vs. Walsh 
In his next bout, Klimov fought Liam Walsh in a final eliminator for the IBF world super featherweight title. Walsh won convincingly on the scorecards, 120-107, 120-107 and 119-108.

Professional boxing record

References

External links

Andrey Klimov - Profile, News Archive & Current Rankings at Box.Live

Living people
1982 births
Russian male boxers
Lightweight boxers
Super-featherweight boxers
People from Klimovsk
Sportspeople from Moscow Oblast
Moscow State Mining University alumni